Calamophyllum is a genus of flowering plants belonging to the family Aizoaceae.

Its native range is South African Republic.

Species:

Calamophyllum cylindricum 
Calamophyllum teretifolium 
Calamophyllum teretiusculum

References

Aizoaceae
Aizoaceae genera